Ivan Massa is a Ugandan airline pilot, who serves as a commercial pilot at Uganda National Airlines Company, the revived national airline of Uganda.

Background and education
Massa was born in Mbale District, in the Eastern Region of Uganda, on 25 November 1990. He 
attended primary school locally. He studied at the London College of St Lawrence, in Wakiso District, in Uganda's Central Region, where he obtained his High School Diploma.

He then went on to obtain his Commercial pilot licence from the East African Civil Aviation Academy in Soroti, Uganda. He underwent further flight training at Epic Flight Academy, located at New Smyrna Beach Municipal Airport, in Volusia County, Florida, United States, and at CAE Aviation Training and Services, in Toronto, Canada.

In 2019, he completed training on the Bombardier CRJ900 at the US Airways Flight Training Center, in Phoenix, Arizona, United States.

Career
In 2019, he was hired as a First Officer pilot on the CRJ900 by Uganda National Airlines Company, trading as Uganda Airlines.

Other considerations
He is reported to be a hiking enthusiast, who enjoys to play rugby, soccer and chess.

See also
 Michael Etiang
 Vanita Kayiwa
 Tina Drazu
 Kenneth Kiyemba

References

Living people
1990 births
Ugandan aviators
Commercial aviators
People from Eastern Region, Uganda
East African Civil Aviation Academy alumni